Laura Jean Englert is an Australian musician from Melbourne, Victoria who performs as Laura Jean. She is known for her classically inspired folk songs, often using a range of orchestral instruments. She garnered much critical acclaim for her debut album, Our Swan Song, receiving high rotational support from community and alternative radio stations such as Triple J. She received high exposure when Snow Patrol, who are big fans of her, asked her to sing Martha Wainwright's part in the song Set the Fire to the Third Bar during their two Australian tours in 2007. Her second album, Eden Land, was released on 1 March 2008 in Australia. In August 2008, Laura Jean was invited by Deborah Conway to take part in the Broad Festival project, which toured major Australian cities including performing at the Sydney Opera House. With Laura Jean and Conway were Elana Stone, Liz Stringer and Dianna Corcoran – they performed their own and each other's songs.

Laura Jean's third album, A Fool Who'll, was selected as album of the week by Melbourne radio station 3RRR for the week of 29 August 2011.

Discography

Albums

Extended plays

Awards and nominations

AIR Awards
The Australian Independent Record Awards (commonly known informally as AIR Awards) is an annual awards night to recognise, promote and celebrate the success of Australia's Independent Music sector.

!  
|-
| rowspan="3"| 2019
| herself
| Best Independent Artist
| 
| rowspan="3"| 
|-
| Devotion
| Best Independent Album
| 
|-
| "Girls on the TV"
| Best Independent Single/EP
| 
|-

Australian Music Prize
The Australian Music Prize (the AMP) is an annual award of $30,000 given to an Australian band or solo artist in recognition of the merit of an album released during the year of award. It exists to discover, reward and promote new Australian music of excellence.

!  
|-
| 2014
| Laura Jean
| Australian Music Prize
| 
| 
|-
| 2018
| Devotion
| Australian Music Prize
| 
| 
|-
| 2022
| Amateurs
| Australian Music Prize
| 
| 
|-

Music Victoria Awards
The Music Victoria Awards are an annual awards night celebrating Victorian music. They commenced in 2006.

! 
|-
|rowspan="3"| 2014
| Laura Jean
| Best Female
| 
|rowspan="6"| 
|-
| Laura Jean
| Best Folk Roots Album
| 
|-
|"My First Love Song"
| Best Song
| 
|-
|rowspan="3"| 2018
| Devotion
| Best Album
| 
|-
| "Girls on the TV"
| Best Song
| 
|-
| Laura Jean
| Best Solo Artist
| 
|-

References

External links
 Official website
 Official Myspace page

1981 births
Living people
Australian folk singers
Musicians from Melbourne
21st-century Australian singers
21st-century Australian women singers